Peraciezie Ward is a ward located under Nagaland's capital city, Kohima. The ward falls under the designated Ward No. 1 of the Kohima Municipal Council.

Education
Educational Institutions in Peraciezie Ward:
 G. Rio School
 Rüzhükhrie Government Higher Secondary School

See also
 Municipal Wards of Kohima

References

External links
 Map of Kohima Ward No. 1

Kohima
Wards of Kohima